Jan Hoffmann (born May 4, 1971)  is a former Danish professional football player. He is currently working as a goalkeeper coach for the U17 and U19 squads of AB. He previously played for the Superliga clubs Akademisk Boldklub, FC Nordsjælland and Vejle BK, as well as other Danish lower-league clubs.

Honours
Danish Cup: 1999

References

External links
Danish national team profile
 Brøndby IF profile
Career statistics at Danmarks Radio

1971 births
Living people
Danish men's footballers
Ølstykke FC players
FC Nordsjælland players
Esbjerg fB players
Vejle Boldklub players
IF Skjold Birkerød players
Association football goalkeepers
Brøndby IF non-playing staff